Ante Aralica (born 23 July 1996) is a Croatian professional footballer who plays as a forward for Albanian club KF Vllaznia Shkodër.

Club career
Aralica started his career at NK Lučko and made his senior debut in August 2014, at the age of 18. In his first season he scored six times in 24 league appearances in the Croatian Second Football League.

In June 2015, Aralica joined Croatian First Football League side NK Lokomotiva, and had loan spells at NK Lučko, NK Sesvete and NK Rudeš before moving permanently to Bulgarian club Lokomotiv Plovdiv in January 2018.

Honours

Club
Lokomotiv Plovdiv
 Bulgarian Cup (2): 2018–19, 2019–20
 Bulgarian Supercup: 2020

References

External links
 

1996 births
Living people
Footballers from Zagreb
Association football forwards
Croatian footballers
NK Lučko players
NK Lokomotiva Zagreb players
NK Sesvete players
NK Rudeš players
PFC Lokomotiv Plovdiv players
FC Hermannstadt players
KF Vllaznia Shkodër players
Croatian Football League players
First Professional Football League (Bulgaria) players
Liga I players
Kategoria Superiore players
Croatian expatriate footballers
Expatriate footballers in Bulgaria
Expatriate footballers in Romania
Expatriate footballers in Albania
Croatian expatriate sportspeople in Bulgaria
Croatian expatriate sportspeople in Romania
Croatian expatriate sportspeople in Albania